"Whoa Is Me" is the third single by Down with Webster from the band's debut EP, Time To Win, Vol. 1. The song became successful in Canada, debuting at number 74 on the Canadian Hot 100 and peaking at number 13. The song was certified Platinum in Canada in January, 2011 with over 80,000 digital downloads.

Music video
The music video for "Whoa Is Me" was filmed at the Sound Academy in Toronto on July 28, 2010. It was directed by Aaron A. The video premiered on MuchMusic on August 31, 2010. It debuted on the MuchMusic Countdown at number 30 on the week of September 2, 2010, and reached number 1 on the week of October 28, 2010. The video was posted on YouTube/Vevo on August 31, 2010 and passed one million views in November of that year.

The music video features the band acting like celebrities with shots of them performing the song. In an interview with Dose.ca, Cam explained how the song "was originally kind of meant to be an ironic stab at that kind of life, that, like, overly hyped, almost celebrity-for-no-good-reason kind of phenomenon that's been going on." He also explained that none of the video actually rings true to how they really act: "Oh! Absolutely none of it, except when we're on stage. I think that's the only look you get into what we actually do. I think everything else is meant to be over the top and ridiculous." He also talked about how the performance scene was recorded at "maybe triple the speed of what it's normally done at, and then, in post-production, we slowed it down. It gives this cool effect where it looks like you're in time, but you're still in slow motion."

The music video received four nominations at the 2011 MuchMusic Video Awards, winning one, Pop Video of the Year. The other three nominations were Video of the Year, UR Fave: Artist, and UR Fave: Video.

Live performances
The song was performed live by the band at the 2010 NHL Face-Off in Toronto on October 7, 2010. It was broadcast across Canada by CBC Television during the second intermission of the Toronto Maple Leafs vs. Montreal Canadiens game. The performance was also broadcast on the NHL Network.

The song was also performed live at the 2010 Grey Cup preshow in Edmonton, Alberta, broadcast by TSN.

Remixes
A few remixes of "Whoa Is Me" have been released. One version of the song was released on December 15, 2009 on iTunes. This version was remixed by Cobra Starship member Alex Suarez. Another remixed version of the song, remixed by Barletta, was released for free on January 25, 2011.

Chart performance
The song debuted on the Canadian Hot 100 at #95 on the week of September 4, 2010. It peaked at #13 on the week of October 16, 2010. "Whoa Is Me" spent a total of 21 weeks on the Canadian Hot 100.  The song was also featured at #85 on the 2010 Canadian Hot 100 Year End Chart.

Track listing

Charts

Weekly charts

Year-end charts

Certifications

References

External links

2010 singles
2010 songs
Down with Webster songs
Universal Motown Records singles
Music videos directed by Aaron A